The 1986–87 Divisional Championship was the fourth edition of the tournament launched by the Rugby Football Union to help prepare England players for test rugby and was contested across three weekends in December 1986.

The tournament was the second to be held after it was revived in a round robin format in 1985. The North Division won the tournament for the third time, winning all three of their games. Each of the other divisional teams won one game. The Rothmans Rugby Yearbook review of the tournament was critical, saying that it “it did not prove as successful as had been hoped, either from the point of view of producing players for England or as a high-quality competition in itself”.

Results

References

Divisional Championship (rugby union)
Divisional Championship
Divisional Championship